The National Agricultural Research, Extension, Education, and Economics Advisory (NAREEE) Board is a 30-member board of the federal government of the United States.  Established by the Food and Agriculture Act of 1977 (P.L. 95-223). In the Federal Agriculture Improvement and Reform Act of 1996 (P.L. 104-137 or the 1996 Farm Bill) NAREEE replaced three existing advisory committees.  The Board, which was reauthorized through 2007 by the 2002 farm bill (P.L. 107–171, Sec. 7133), advises USDA on national priorities and policies related to food, agriculture, agricultural research, extension, education, and economics.

Board Members 

 Dr. Dana Allen-Tully, Gar-Lin Dairy, LLC
 Dr. Edmund Buckner, Alcorn State University
 Lisabeth Hobart, GROWMARK, Inc
 Dr. V.M. "Bala" Balasubramaniam, Ohio State University
 Dr. Mario Ferruzzi, University of Arkansas
 Dr. Kenrett Jefferson-Moore, North Carolina A&T State University
 Dr. Mark Lawrence, Mississippi State University
 Dr. Michael Oltrogge, Nebraska Indian Community College
 Dr. Ariel Ortiz-Bobea, Cornell University
 Dr. Annette Levi, California State University, Fresno
 Donnell Brown, National Grape Research Alliance
 Richard De Los Santos, Texas Department of Agriculture
 Marguerite Green, SPROUT
 Dr. Jane Kolodinsky, University of Vermont
 Tambra Raye Stevenson, Women Advancing Nutrition Dietetics and Agriculture (WANDA)

References 

United States Department of Agriculture